Pleurofusia pseudosubtilis is an extinct species of sea snail, a marine gastropod mollusk in the family Drilliidae.

Distribution
This extinct marine species was found France.

References

 Lozouet P. (2015). Nouvelles espèces de gastéropodes (Mollusca: Gastropoda) de l'Oligocène et du Miocène inférieur d'Aquitaine (Sud-Ouest de la France). Partie 5. Cossmanniana. 17: 15–84.

External links

pseudosubtilis
Gastropods described in 1931